William Durant may refer to:
 Will Durant (1885–1981), historian and philosopher
 William C. Durant (1861–1947), industrialist and founder of General Motors Corporation
 William West Durant (1850–1934), architect and developer of camps in the Adirondack Great Camp style
 William A. Durant (1866–1948), American politician in Oklahoma

See also
Guillaume Durand (disambiguation)